Kafraj (also Romanized as Kafrāj and Kefraj; also known as Kafrāsh) is a village in Tariq ol Eslam Rural District, in the Central District of Nahavand County, Hamadan Province, Iran. At the 2006 census, its population was 1,670, in 421 families.

References 

Populated places in Nahavand County